Eoperipatus is a Southeast Asian genus of velvet worm in the family Peripatidae. The number of legs in this genus varies within species as well as among species and ranges from 22 pairs (in E. butleri) to 25 pairs (in E. horsti and E. weldoni). This genus exhibits lecithotrophic ovoviviparity; that is, mothers in this genus retain yolky eggs in their uteri.

Species 
The genus contains the following described species:

 Eoperipatus butleri Evans, 1901
 Eoperipatus horsti Evans, 1901
 Eoperipatus totoro Oliveira et al., 2013
 Eoperipatus weldoni Evans, 1901

Eoperipatus sumatranus (Sedgwick, 1888) is considered a nomen dubium by Oliveira et al. 2012.

First recorded in Vietnam, Eoperipatus has now been found distributed throughout South-East Asia. An undescribed species is known to occur in Thailand. In addition, unidentified onychophorans have also been observed in Borneo and in central Vietnam, north of the known distribution of Eoperipatus totoro. These may or may not represent distinct species. These species have been hard to study as they live in cryptic environments and have low population densities.

References

External links 
 
 

Onychophorans of southeast Asia
Onychophoran genera